A second referendum on membership of the European Economic Area was held in Liechtenstein on 9 April 1995. Although a previous referendum in 1992 had seen the majority of votes in favour, the country had not joined the EEA on its formation in 1994. The result of the second referendum, which also included a treaty with neighbouring Switzerland, was 55.88% in favour of membership, with voter turnout at 82.03%. Liechtenstein subsequently joined the EEA in May.

Results

References

1995 referendums
1995 in Liechtenstein
Referendums in Liechtenstein
April 1995 events in Europe